A72 or A-72 may refer to:

 A72 road (Great Britain), a major road in the United Kingdom
 A72 motorway (France)
 Autovía A-72, a Spanish motorway
 Benoni Defense, a chess opening
 Bundesautobahn 72, a German motorway
 ARM Cortex-A72, a computer processor microarchitecture
 Samsung Galaxy A72, a smartphone released in 2021